Germaine Martha de Randamie (born April 24, 1984) is a Dutch mixed martial artist and former kickboxer. Undefeated in sanctioned kickboxing bouts, she competes in the Ultimate Fighting Championship (UFC) and was the first UFC Women's Featherweight Champion. Prior to joining the UFC, de Randamie competed in the Strikeforce featherweight division.

Kickboxing 
De Randamie competed in kickboxing with an undefeated record of 46–0 including 30 knockouts.

Mixed martial arts career

Early MMA career 
De Randamie made her MMA debut on December 19, 2008, at Revolution Fight Club 2. She faced Vanessa Porto and was defeated via submission (armbar) in the first round.

On September 11, 2010, de Randamie earned her first MMA win when she defeated Nikohl Johnson via unanimous decision at Playboy Fight Night 5.

Strikeforce 
De Randamie debuted for Strikeforce on January 29, 2011, at Strikeforce: Diaz vs. Cyborg against Stephanie Webber. She defeated Webber via knockout in the first round.

De Randamie next faced Julia Budd in a rematch from a past Muay Thai bout at Strikeforce Challengers 16: Fodor vs. Terry on June 24, 2011. She was defeated via unanimous decision.

On August 18, 2012, de Randamie faced Hiroko Yamanaka at Strikeforce: Rousey vs. Kaufman. She won the fight via unanimous decision (30–27, 30–27, and 30–27).

Ultimate Fighting Championship

Women's bantamweight 
On April 18, 2013, it was announced that de Randamie would make her Ultimate Fighting Championship debut on July 27, 2013.

De Randamie debuted against Julie Kedzie at UFC on Fox 8. Relying mostly on clinch work, Germaine won the fight via split decision (30–27, 28–29, and 29–28).

De Randamie next faced Amanda Nunes at UFC Fight Night 31 on November 6, 2013. She lost the fight via TKO in the first round.

De Randamie next faced Larissa Pacheco at UFC 185 on March 14, 2015. She won the fight via TKO in the second round.

Women's featherweight 
De Randamie faced former bantamweight champion, Holly Holm, at UFC 208 for the inaugural UFC Women's Featherweight Championship on February 11, 2017.  She won the fight via unanimous decision. At the end of the second and third rounds, de Randamie continued to throw punches after the horn had sounded. The first of those punches was a right hand that visibly wobbled Holm, who had already stopped fighting.  The referee, however, did not take a point on either occasion, which affected the result of the fight and drew criticism from UFC president Dana White. Of the media outlets that reported on the fight, 14 of 23 media outlets scored the bout in favour of Holm. After the fight, de Randamie stated that the blows after the horn were unintentional. In contrast, Holm stated that she believed de Randamie's punches after the horn was intentional.

Stripping of Women’s Featherweight Championship 
In late May, de Randamie released a statement over social media that she plans to move back to the bantamweight division and rejected the fight with Cris Cyborg due to her repeated transgressions with PEDs. Her decision on not wanting to fight Cyborg drew criticism from many in the media by claiming she was avoiding Cyborg and ignoring her responsibility as a champion to fight any and all challengers. In turn, the promotion stripped her of the title on June 19, 2017. Instead, the newly signed Megan Anderson replaced her and was slated to face Cyborg for the UFC Women's Featherweight Championship at UFC 214, before Anderson herself was then replaced by Invicta Bantamweight Champion Tonya Evinger.

Returning to bantamweight division 
De Randamie was expected to face Marion Reneau on September 2, 2017, at UFC Fight Night 115. However, de Randamie pulled out citing injury and was replaced by Talita Bernardo.

A bout against Ketlen Vieira was announced for UFC Fight Night 125 on February 3, 2018. However, the bout was soon canceled due to a hand injury sustained by de Randamie.

De Randamie faced former title challenger Raquel Pennington at UFC Fight Night 139 on November 10, 2018. She won the fight via unanimous decision.

On March 8, 2019, de Randamie signed a new 6-fight contract with the UFC.

De Randamie faced Aspen Ladd on July 13, 2019, at UFC Fight Night 155. She won the fight via technical knockout in round one.

De Randamie faced Amanda Nunes in a rematch, on December 14, 2019 at UFC 245 for UFC women's bantamweight title fight. She lost the fight via unanimous decision.

De Randamie faced Julianna Peña on October 4, 2020 at UFC on ESPN: Holm vs. Aldana. De Randamie defeated Peña via guillotine submission, the first submission win in her career.  This win earned her the Performance of the Night bonus.

De Randamie was next expected to face Irene Aldana at UFC 268 on November 6, 2021 in New York, NY.   However, de Randamie withdrew in early September due to injury.

Championships and accomplishments 
Kickboxing/Muay Thai
WIKBA world champion (2005/2006/2008)
IKCC World champion (2008)
IMTF world champion (2005)
WPKL World champion (2006)
WPKL European champion (2003)
Women's record for consecutive victories (46)
Mixed martial arts
Ultimate Fighting Championship
UFC Women's Featherweight Championship (One time, first)
Performance of the Night (Two times) 
Fastest knockout in UFC Women's Bantamweight division (16 seconds, tied with Ronda Rousey)

Personal life 
De Randamie was born in Utrecht to an Afro-Surinamese father and a Dutch mother.

De Randamie is a police officer in the Netherlands and worked as a psychiatric nurse prior to becoming a police officer.

De Randamie knocked out a man named Tom Waes who was 40 lbs heavier than her in a boxing match.

She currently lives in Utrecht with her girlfriend. In September 2022, De Randamie announced she was pregnant with the couple's first child.

Mixed martial arts record 

|-
|Win
|align=center|10–4
|Julianna Peña
|Technical Submission (guillotine choke)
|UFC on ESPN: Holm vs. Aldana
|
|align=center|3
|align=center|3:25
|Abu Dhabi, United Arab Emirates
|
|-
|Loss
|align=center|9–4
|Amanda Nunes
|Decision (unanimous)
|UFC 245 
|
|align=center|5
|align=center|5:00
|Las Vegas, Nevada, United States
|
|-
|Win
|align=center|9–3
|Aspen Ladd
|TKO (punch)
|UFC Fight Night: de Randamie vs. Ladd 
|
|align=center|1
|align=center|0:16
|Sacramento, California, United States
|
|-
|Win
|align=center|8–3
|Raquel Pennington
|Decision (unanimous)
|UFC Fight Night: The Korean Zombie vs. Rodríguez 
|
|align=center|3
|align=center|5:00
|Denver, Colorado, United States
|
|-
|Win
|align=center|7–3
|Holly Holm
|Decision (unanimous)
|UFC 208
|
|align=center|5
|align=center|5:00
|Brooklyn, New York, United States
|
|-
|Win
|align=center|6–3
|Anna Elmose
|TKO (knee to the body)
|UFC Fight Night: Overeem vs. Arlovski
|
|align=center|1
|align=center|3:46
|Rotterdam, Netherlands
|
|-
| Win
| align=center| 5–3
| Larissa Pacheco
| TKO (punches)
| UFC 185
| 
| align=center| 2
| align=center| 2:02
| Dallas, Texas, United States
|
|-
| Loss
| align=center| 4–3
| Amanda Nunes
| TKO (elbows)
| UFC: Fight for the Troops 3
| 
| align=center| 1
| align=center| 3:56
| Fort Campbell, Kentucky, United States
|
|-
| Win
| align=center| 4–2
| Julie Kedzie
| Decision (split)
| UFC on Fox: Johnson vs. Moraga
| 
| align=center| 3
| align=center| 5:00
| Seattle, Washington, United States
| 
|-
| Win
| align=center| 3–2
| Hiroko Yamanaka
| Decision (unanimous)
| Strikeforce: Rousey vs. Kaufman
| 
| align=center| 3
| align=center| 5:00
| San Diego, California, United States
|
|-
| Loss
| align=center| 2–2
| Julia Budd
| Decision (unanimous)
| Strikeforce Challengers: Fodor vs. Terry
| 
| align=center| 3
| align=center| 5:00
| Kent, Washington, United States
| 
|-
| Win
| align=center| 2–1
| Stephanie Webber
| KO (knee)
| Strikeforce: Diaz vs. Cyborg
| 
| align=center| 1
| align=center| 4:25
| San Jose, California, United States
|
|-
| Win
| align=center| 1–1
| Nikohl Johnson
| Decision (unanimous)
| Playboy Fight Night 5
| 
| align=center| 3
| align=center| 5:00
| Los Angeles, California, United States
|
|-
| Loss
| align=center| 0–1
| Vanessa Porto
| Submission (armbar)
| Revolution Fight Club 2
| 
| align=center| 1
| align=center| 3:36
| Miami, Florida, United States
|

Kickboxing record (Incomplete) 

|- style="background:#cfc;"
|
| Win
| align=left |  Lena Buytendijk
|The Next Generation Warriors 5
| align=left |  Utrecht, Netherlands
| Decision
| 3
| 3:00
| 37–0
|-
|- style="background:#cfc;"
|
| Win
| align=left |  Casey Bohrman 
|Slamm!! V
| align=left |  Paramaribo, Suriname
| KO
| 2
| N/A
| 36–0
|-
|- style="background:#cfc;"
|
| Win
| align=left |  Julie Kitchen
|N/A
| align=left |  Montego Bay, Jamaica
| Decision
| 3
| 3:00
| 35–0
|-
! style=background:white colspan=9 |
|- style="background:#cfc;"
|
| Win
| align=left |  Julia Budd
|The Next Generation Warriors 
| align=left |  Utrecht, Netherlands
| TKO (punches)
| 1
| 1:57
| 34–0
|-
|- style="background:#cfc;"
|
| Win
| align=left |  Maria Verheijen
|M-1 Challenge
| align=left |  Amsterdam, Netherlands
| Points
| 3
| 3:00
| 33–0
|-
|- style="background:#cfc;"
|
| Win
| align=left |  Michela Mancini
|N/A
| align=left |  Rosmalen, Netherlands
| Decision
| 3
| 3:00
| 32–0
|-
|- style="background:#cfc;"
|
| Win
| align=left |  Karla Benitez
|RINGS Promotion
| align=left |  Utrecht, Netherlands
| TKO
| N/A
| N/A
| 31–0
|-
|- style="background:#cfc;"
|
| Win
| align=left |  Keri Scarr
|N/A
| align=left |  Netherlands
| KO (knee)
| N/A
| N/A
| 30–0
|-
|- style="background:#cfc;"
|
| Win
| align=left |  Hatice Özyurt
|N/A
| align=left |  Netherlands
| Decision
| 3
| 3:00
| 29–0
|-
|- style="background:#cfc;"
|
| Win
| align=left |  Joanna Generowicz
|2H2H: Pride & Honor
| align=left |  Rotterdam, Netherlands
| TKO
| 1
| N/A
| 28–0
|-
|- style="background:#cfc;"
|
| Win
| align=left |  Sonia Mirabelli
|N/A
| align=left |  Netherlands
| KO
| 1
| N/A
| 27–0
|-
! style=background:white colspan=9 |
|- style="background:#cfc;"
|
| Win
| align=left |  Jacqueline Fuchs
|Slamm: Holland vs Thailand 2
| align=left |  Almere, Netherlands
| TKO (retirement)
| N/A
| N/A
| 26–0
|-
|- style="background:#cfc;"
|
| Win
| align=left |  Chajmaa Bellakhal
|N/A
| align=left |  Rosmalen, Netherlands
| Decision
| 3
| 3:00
| 25–0
|-
|- style="background:#cfc;"
|
| Win
| align=left |  Angela Rivera-Parr
|N/A
| align=left |  Victorville, California, United States
| KO
| 1
| 2:35
| 24–0
|-
! style=background:white colspan=9 |
|- style="background:#cfc;"
|
| Win
| align=left |  Asako Saioka
|N/A
| align=left |  Amsterdam, Netherlands
| Points
| N/A
| N/A
| 23–0
|-
! style=background:white colspan=9 |
|- style="background:#cfc;"
|
| Win
| align=left |  Tricia McKeary
|N/A
| align=left |  Utrecht, Netherlands
| N/A
| N/A
| N/A
| 22–0
|-
|- style="background:#cfc;"
|
| Win
| align=left |  Dina Pedro
|Muay Thai League XIII
| align=left |  Rotterdam, Netherlands
| Decision
| N/A
| N/A
| 21–0
|-
|- style="background:#cfc;"
|
| Win
| align=left |  N/A
|IMTF Championships 2003
| align=left |  Thailand
| Points
| N/A
| N/A
| 20–0
|-
! style=background:white colspan=9 |
|- style="background:#cfc;"
|
| Win
| align=left |  Fiona Hayes
|N/A
| align=left |  London, England
| KO
| N/A
| N/A
| 19–0
|-
! style=background:white colspan=9 |
|- style="background:#cfc;"
|
| Win
| align=left |  Brenda Duijneveld
|N/A
| align=left |  Amsterdam, Netherlands
| Decision
| 3
| 3:00
| 18–0
|-
! style=background:white colspan=9 |
|- style="background:#cfc;"
|
| Win
| align=left |  Marjolein Hulshof
|Muay Thai Hoofddorp
| align=left |  Hoofddorp, Netherlands
| Decision
| 3
| 3:00
| 17–0
|-
! style=background:white colspan=9 |
|- style="background:#cfc;"
|
| Win
| align=left |  Dagmar van Alfen
|N/A
| align=left |  Madrid, Spain
| Decision
| 5
| 3:00
| 16–0 
|-
|- style="background:#cfc;"
|
| Win
| align=left |  Marja Vonk
|N/A
| align=left |  Netherlands
| N/A
| N/A
| N/A
| 15–0 
|-
! style=background:white colspan=9 |
|- style="background:#cfc;"
|
| Win
| align=left |  Lesly van Es
|N/A
| align=left |  Amsterdam, Netherlands
| N/A
| N/A
| N/A
| 14–0 
|-
|-
| colspan=9 | Legend:

See also 
 List of current UFC fighters
 List of female mixed martial artists

References

External links
 
 

1984 births
Living people
Dutch female mixed martial artists
Dutch female kickboxers
Female Muay Thai practitioners
Sportspeople from Utrecht (city)
Dutch sportspeople of Surinamese descent
Featherweight mixed martial artists
Bantamweight mixed martial artists
Mixed martial artists utilizing kickboxing
Mixed martial artists utilizing Muay Thai
Mixed martial artists utilizing boxing
Ultimate Fighting Championship champions
Ultimate Fighting Championship female fighters
Dutch LGBT sportspeople
LGBT mixed martial artists